The Bangladesh National Awami Party  is a political party in Bangladesh. The party traces its origins to a splinter group of the National Awami Party (Bhashani) led by Mashiur Rahman, who was popularly known as Jadu Mia. Jadu Mia's NAP faction had merged with the Bangladesh Nationalist Party in the late 1970s. Jadu Mia's son Shafiqul Ghani Swapan refounded the Bangladesh National Awami Party in December 2006. Shafiqul Ghani Swapan died in 2009, after which Jebel Rahman Ghaani took over as party chairman.

Organization
As of 2020, Jebel Rahman Ghaani served as party chairman and M. Golam Mostafa Bhuiyan as party general secretary. The party was registered with the Bangladesh Election Commission as 'Bangladesh National Awami Party-Bangladesh NAP' on November 13, 2008. The election symbol of the party is a cow. As of 2019 the party claimed to have organized committees in 38 districts. The party is led by a 71-member Central Committee.

Electoral politics and alliances
In 2012, the party joined the BNP-led 20-party alliance. The party boycotted the 2014 Bangladeshi general election.

The party broke away from the 20-party alliance on October 16, 2018. Along with the National Democratic Party, the Bangladesh NAP protested against the alliance of BNP with the Jatiya Oikya Front. Subsequently, Bangladesh NAP and NDP joined the Bikalpa Dhara Bangladesh-led Juktafront.

References

Political parties in Bangladesh